Return to Earth 91–93 is a compilation album from California Stoner rock band Fu Manchu on Elastic Records. The album is a collection of three early singles released in 1992, along with two bonus songs. The band features Scott Votaw
on lead guitar before he was replaced by Eddie Glass on the debut album. This compilation has more of a gritty and punk edge to it than their later albums did.

Track listing
"Don't Bother Knockin' (If This Van's Rockin')" - 3:55
"Senioritis" - 2:42
"Pick-Up Summer" - 2:33
"El Don" - 2:23
"Ojo Rojo" - 3:44
"Simco" - 3:08
"Space Sucker" - 3:05
"Pinbuster" - 2:14
"Vankhana (Rollin' Rooms)" - 4:16

Tracks 1 and 7 originally appeared on the "Don't Bother Knockin' (If This Van's Rockin')" single. 
Tracks 2, 4 and 8 originally appeared on the "Senioritis" single. 
Tracks 3 and 9 originally appeared on the "Pick-Up Summer" single. 
An alternative version of track 5 ("Ojo Rojo") appears on No One Rides for Free. 
"Simco" was previously unreleased.

References

Fu Manchu (band) albums
1998 compilation albums